Martha Adusei (born 8 June 1976) is a Ghanaian-Canadian sprinter. She competed in the women's 100 metres at the 2000 Summer Olympics for Canada. Previously, she represented Ghana, including at the 1994 Commonwealth Games.

References

External links
 
 

1976 births
Living people
Ghanaian female sprinters
Canadian female sprinters
Ghanaian emigrants to Canada
Olympic track and field athletes of Canada
Athletes (track and field) at the 2000 Summer Olympics
World Athletics Championships athletes for Canada
Athletes (track and field) at the 1994 Commonwealth Games
Commonwealth Games competitors for Ghana
Athletes (track and field) at the 1998 Commonwealth Games
Commonwealth Games competitors for Canada
Black Canadian female track and field athletes
Olympic female sprinters